John J. Keane may refer to:
 John J. Keane (politician), Irish politician
 John J. Keane (bishop) (1839–1918), American Roman Catholic archbishop of Dubuque
 Johnny Keane (John Joseph Keane, 1911–1967), Major League Baseball manager

See also
John Keane (disambiguation)